Peters's myotis or the small black myotis (Myotis ater) is a species of insectivorous vesper bat. It is found in Indonesia, Malaysia, Thailand, Vietnam, and the Philippines; its exact distribution is uncertain as it is difficult to distinguish from some other Myotis species. It appears adaptable to a variety of habitats, including primary tropical moist lowland forest, secondary forest, agricultural areas and villages.

References

Mouse-eared bats
Bats of Oceania
Bats of Southeast Asia
Bats of Malaysia
Mammals of Borneo
Mammals of Indonesia
Mammals of the Philippines
Mammals of Papua New Guinea
Mammals of Western New Guinea
Mammals of Thailand
Mammals of Vietnam
Mammals described in 1866
Taxa named by Wilhelm Peters
Taxonomy articles created by Polbot